The Eken is a 2022 Indian Bengali-language detective crime film directed by  Joydeep Mukherjee. The film is produced by Shrikant Mohta and Mahendra Soni under the banner of Shree Venkatesh Films. In the film,  Anirban Chakrabarti plays the titular role of Ekenbabu, a fictional detective created by the Bengali author, Sujan Dasgupta. Padmanabha Dasgupta has written the screenplay for the film. The film was a commercial as well as a critical success. It released in theatres on 14 April, 2022 and despite clashing with K.G.F: Chapter 2, it was well received by the audience and had a great run at the box office.

Plot 
During his trip to Darjeeling with Bapi and Promotho, Lalbazar Detective, Ekendra Sen has a chance meeting with the famous film star Bipasha Mitra and gets caught up in the investigation of a missing ancestral photograph and a precious stamp that belonged to her grandfather. At the same time, Ekenbabu also gets an offer from Bipasha's friend and business partner, Debraj Singh, to work on a murder case. As the mystery deepens, he discovers a valuable Lord Vishnu idol has been stolen from Bipasha's statue collection. He sets forth to find out if both the cases are linked to each other with the support of the local police. Though it's a mess, Ekenbabu succeeds in solving the case and catching the culprits with the help of a stranger who turns out to be on the same team as him.

Cast 
 Anirban Chakrabarti as Ekenbabu
 Payel Sarkar as Bipasha Mitra 
 Suhotra Mukhopadhay as Bapi
 Somak Ghosh as Pramatha
 Debasish Mondal as Debraj Singh
 Debopriyo Mukherjee as Bubun Kar
 Indrajit Mazumder as Jiten Ghosh
 Kaushik Chattopadhyay as Jayanta Biswas

Production 
The principal photography of the film began on 28 January, 2022. The film was wrapped up on February, 2022 with a few scenes shot during the pandemic.

The cinematographer of the film is Ramyadip Saha. The editing of the film is done by Rabiranjan Maitra and Md. Piyasuddin. The production is designed by Ranjit Gorai. The costume designer is Jayanti Sen. The makeup is done by Sourav Ganguly. The sound is designed and mixed by Srijit Gupta.

Release 
The teaser of the film released on 22 March, 2022. The trailer of the film released on 25 March, 2022. The film released in theatres on 14 April, 2022 coinciding with Poila Baisakh or the Bengali New Year.

Soundtrack

Reception 
Shamayita Chakraborty rated the film 4/5, reviewing for The Times of India and opined that the movie is worth watching for Eken Babu's humour and great performances but the plot is weak thus making the storyline predictable. Roushini Sarkar, reviewing for Cinestaan, rated 2/4 and opined that the movie has multiple twists, however, the writing is poor and the execution of twists is boring. She praised the performances of Mukhopadhay and Ghosh but criticized that of the others.

References

External links
 

Bengali-language Indian films
Indian detective films
2020s Bengali-language films